Kfar Qassem Municipal Stadium, is a football stadium currently being built in Kfar Qasim for F.C. Kafr Qasim, the football team of the town.
Once completed in 2020, the new stadium will include 8,000 seats, along with all the Facilities that required by the regulations.
Kfar Qassem Municipal Football Stadium - Hashalom Stadium - is located in the northern Part of Kfar Qassem, and designed by the architect Moti Bodek.
The first phase will include the western tribune, the grass surface, the lighting system, and the Parking lot. The second phase will include the completion of the facilities structure and the roof on the west side, and The third phase will include the construction of the eastern tribune including the roof.  In order to complete the entire stadium will need a budget of 50 million NIS.

See also
 High-tech architecture

References
 מחלקת ספורט עיריית כפר קאסם قسم الرياضه بلدية كفرقاسم (in Arabic) 30.4.2016
 Un nouveau stade pour le FC Kafr Qasim (in Français) 7.5.2016
 Kfar Qassem Football Stadium (in Arabic) 10.1.2017
 Kfar Qassem Football Stadium (in Arabic) 13.1.2017

External links
 List of High-tech Buildings

 
Multi-purpose stadiums in Israel
Football venues in Israel
Stadiums under construction
Sports venues in Central District (Israel)